This is a list of films which placed number-one at the weekend box office in China during 2020.

See also
List of Chinese films of 2020

References

2020
China
2020 in Chinese cinema